The Woman in Red may refer to:

Film
 The Woman in Red (1984 film), a 1984 film starring Gene Wilder
 The Woman in Red (soundtrack), produced by Motown
 The Woman in Red (1935 film), a 1935 film starring Barbara Stanwyck
 The Woman in Red (1947 film), a French crime film

Other uses
 The Woman in Red (novel), a 1941 novel by Anthony Gilbert
 Woman in Red (comics), one of the earliest superheroines
 Ana Cumpănaș (Anna Sage), who was nicknamed "the Woman in Red" for the dress she wore when John Dillinger was killed
 Melisandre, a character from the A Song of Ice and Fire fantasy novel series and its television adaptation Game of Thrones, often referred to as "The Red Woman"

See also
 "The Red Woman", an episode from Game of Thrones
 The Woman in the Red Dress, a minor character in the movie The Matrix
 Women in Red, a Wikiproject to create new articles about notable women
 Girl in Red, a Norwegian singer-songwriter (born 1999)
 The Lady in Red (disambiguation)
 Red Lady (disambiguation)
 Scarlet woman (disambiguation)